Safa Al Hashem (born April 14, 1964) is a politician who was an elected Member of Parliament to the Kuwait Parliament. In Kuwait history, she was the only female member to be elected to the Kuwait parliament consecutively more than two times. In 2020, she lost her seat after getting only 430 votes in 2020 compared to 3,273 in 2016.

Education 

Al Hashem obtained a  degree in English literature from Kuwait University and completed her MBA from the Pennsylvania State University. She also has a post graduate executive education diploma from Harvard Business School. 
In 2011, she was awarded a Ph.D, Doctorate (Honoris causa) by the American University of Technology.

Career 

Before entering politics, Al Hashem worked for the government in the Ministry of Higher Education. She later worked in various private companies being associated with PIC, PWC and the KIPCO Group. Al Hashem then started Advantage Consulting in partnership with KIPCO and Gulf One Investment Bank, Bahrain.

Politics 

Al Hashem first stood for elections for 3rd Constituency in 2012 and won. After this parliament was annulled, she stood again from the same constituency and won again. 
In the 2012 assembly, she served as the rapporteur of the Economic and Financial Affairs committee, and was a member of the Response to the Amiri Addrss and Foreign Affairs committees.

Al Hashem is notorious for her populist comments against foreigners living in Kuwait, including recommending that foreigners should be banned from obtaining driving licenses and should be taxed to walk on the streets. She also called on the government to impose charges on expatriates for everything they do, including taxing the air they breathe in the country".

Awards 

 2009 Business Woman of the Year.
 2007 Female CEO of the year - CEO Middle East

References 

1964 births
Living people
Kuwaiti women in politics
21st-century women politicians
Members of the National Assembly (Kuwait)
Kuwait University alumni
Harvard Business School alumni